Linda Cainberg (born 10 July 1986) is a Finnish handball player for HIFK Handboll and the Finnish national team.

References

1986 births
Living people
Finnish female handball players
Sportspeople from Vantaa